The Manitoba Human Rights Commission (MHRC) is a quasi-judicial arms-length agency of the Government of Manitoba that is responsible for enforcing The Human Rights Code (Manitoba).

The acting chairperson of the Board of Commissioners is John Burchill, who is chief of staff for the Winnipeg Police Service.

Board of Commissioners 
, the Board of Commissioners includes:

 John Burchill (acting chairperson) — chief of staff for the Winnipeg Police Service.
 Loretta Ross — a lawyer and the Treaty Relations Commissioner of Manitoba.
 Jeannette Acheson — a parole officer for the Correctional Service of Canada, the Vice Chair of the Manitoba Police Commission, and a trustee for the Canadian Museum for Human Rights.
 Michael Reader — the Director of Capital Management for the Northern Regional Health Authority.
 Ian Grant — former Chief of Police with the City of Brandon-Brandon Police Service, a special advisor for Public Safety programs at Assiniboine Community College.
 Tracy Leipsic — a speed skating coach with the River Heights Speed Skating Club, and the Vice President (Finance) of the Manitoba Speed Skating Association.
 Darcy Strutinsky — a member of the Manitoba Labour Board and the Labour Management Review Committee, and with the Children’s Hospital Foundation of Manitoba.

References

Government of Manitoba
Human rights organizations based in Canada